Hassan Rashid al-Sari (born 1953) is a syrian poet and writer who was a former Syrian Minister of State for investment affairs  ,who served sometime during 2006 and sometime starting from 2011 until unknown year(before 2020). 

Al-Sari was born in 1953 in Hama. He earned a degree in Arabic at the University of Damascus in 1979. He is a poet and a member of the Arab Writers Union. He is a member of the Amin Hama branch of the Socialist Unionist Party and a member of the CPC Central Committee.

Al-Sari is married and has one child.

See also
Cabinet of Syria

References

Minister of State Hassan al-Sari, SANA
Biography of the new Syrian government 2011 – the names and lives of government ministers, Syria FM, 17 April 2011

1953 births
People from Damascus
Living people
Syrian ministers of state
Damascus University alumni